This is a list of all the Ultra prominent peaks (with topographic prominence greater than 1,500 metres) in the Karakoram, Hindu Kush and neighbouring ranges. The list includes 4 of the 14 8000m summits, all in the Karakoram, including the second highest mountain in the world, K2. There are a further 19 Ultras in the Karakoram and 5 in the Hindu Kush over 7,000m. The Ultras of the Himalayas lie to the south east and are listed separately. To the north are the Pamirs, and to the east the mountains of Tibet.

Despite their height, only 3 mountains are among the 100 most prominent mountains, K2, in 22nd place, Tirich Mir (30) and Batura Sar (77).  A further 3 are on the list of 125 most prominent mountains: Buni Zom (117); Kuh-e Bandaka (118); and Rakaposhi (122).

Karakoram

Hindu Kush

South of the Khyber Pass

Hindu Raj

Sources
 Afghanistan & Pakistan
 Karakoram etc
 Map

Western Himalayan Ultras
Himalayas
Karakoram and Hindu Kush